"This House" is a song by American singer–songwriter Tracie Spencer. This song was the second single released from Spencer's second album, Make the Difference (1990). Issued via the Capitol Records label, the single was released on November 7, 1990.

"This House" was Spencer's second consecutive top-ten hit on the US Billboard Hot R&B Singles chart, where it peaked at number seven. The song was her most successful single on the Billboard Hot 100, reaching number three in March 1991. Outside the US, "This House" peaked at number 41 in Canada and number 26 in New Zealand, and it became a minor hit in Australia and the United Kingdom.

Charts

Weekly charts

Year-end charts

References

Tracie Spencer songs
1990 singles
1990 songs
Capitol Records singles
Songs written by Matt Sherrod